Venu Srinivasan is an Indian industrialist. He is Chairman Emeritus of TVS Motor Company, one of the leading manufacturers of two-wheelers in the world and Sundaram-Clayton Limited, a leading manufacturer of auto components in India. He also serves on the board of Tata Sons Ltd., the holding company of the conglomerate the Tata Group and TVS & Sons.  He is a Director on the Central Board of Reserve Bank of India. He is also Vice Chairman of Tata Trusts. Tata Trusts holds 66% of the equity capital of Tata Sons. He was conferred the Padma Bhushan Award, the third Highest civilian award in India, in January 2020.

As part of the social outreach of TVS Motors and Sundaram-Clayton, he started and oversees Srinivasan Services Trust (SST), which works in more than 2500 villages in India. SST follows a holistic development approach in villages with active participation of the community. The focus areas are societal development through development of women and children, water conservation, improving livelihoods through agriculture &  livestock and preservation & conservation of environment.

Srinivasan was also the Chairman, Board of Trustees, of the Srirangam Sri Ranganathaswamy Temple and has supported restoration work at the complex and several other ancient temples in India. He was also appointed as a non-official director on the Central Board of Reserve Bank of India in 2022.

Career

Venu Srinivasan is the grandson of the TVS Group's founder, T. V. Sundaram Iyengar. He did his schooling at Don Bosco Matriculation Higher Secondary School, Chennai. After graduating from the College of Engineering, Guindy, he completed a Master of Science degree in Management from Purdue University in Indiana (United States).

He has received a Doctor of Management by Purdue University and a Doctor of Science by University of Warwick in Coventry, UK and the Indian Institute of Technology (IIT) Kharagpur, India.

He became the managing director of Sundaram-Clayton in May 1979. He went on to become the chairman of TVS Motor Company.
In the late 1980s, Srinivasan scripted a turnaround for the two-wheeler maker, which was mired in labour troubles with striking workers, leading to mounting losses. Srinivasan shut the factory down for three months, forcing the unions to relent. He then upgraded plant machinery, invested in new technologies and implemented Total Quality Management (TQM), a Japanese method of process-driven manufacturing.

He also brought in Professor Lord Kumar Bhattacharyya of the University of Warwick as a consultant to provide guidance. In 2001, ending years of partnership with Suzuki, TVS Motor Company split from the Japanese automaker and started manufacturing on its own.

TVS Motor Company re-entered the market by launching TVS Victor – India's first indigenously built four-stroke motorcycle. The launches that followed, set TVS Motor on the path to becoming India's third-largest two-wheeler manufacturer.

Srinivasan later brought in Professor Yasutoshi Washio of Japan, a Deming Application Prize Winner and Japanese quality management guru Professor Yoshikazu Tsuda as mentors to strengthen the TQM processes within the company. Today, its facilities also make bikes for BMW Motorrad through a strategic partnership with the German firm.

Under Srinivasan's leadership as the Managing Director, Sundaram-Clayton's brakes division won the Deming Prize in 1998 for having "achieved distinctive performance improvements through application of company-wide quality control". In 2002, TVS Motor Company also won the Deming Prize, becoming the first two-wheeler company in the world to do so. In 2019, Srinivasan himself received the Deming Distinguished Service Award, granted to individuals who have made outstanding contributions in the dissemination and promotion of Total Quality Management.

Awards and honours
Venu Srinivasan was elected as President of Confederation of Indian Industry (CII) year 2009-10. Srinivasan was conferred the coveted Padma Shri Award by the President of India in 2010 for his contributions in the field of trade and industry. He is the "Goodwill Envoy for Culture and Diplomacy of the Republic of Korea". He was earlier the Honorary Consul General, Republic of Korea (in Chennai). In 2010, he was honoured by South Korean President Lee Myung-bak, with the civilian honour, Order of Diplomatic Service Merit, in recognition of his contribution to promoting bilateral relations between South Korea and India.

Asian Network for Quality (ANQ) chose Srinivasan as one of the winners for its Ishikawa-Kano Award for the year 2012, for his contribution to the theory and practice of quality management within TVS Motor Company.

Srinivasan was appointed the Honorary Commander of Korean Naval vessel, ROKS Choi Young (DDH-981) for his dedication to enhance the friendship and co-operation between the Republic of Korea and the Republic of India. In December 2014, Srinivasan was conferred an honorary citizenship by the Mayor of Busan Metropolitan City, the 2nd largest city in Korea.

Criticism 
Venu Srinivasan has also been criticised on multiple counts when he was the Chairman of Board of Trustees of the Sri Ranganathaswamy temple, Srirangam as head of Thiruppani committee of the Kabaleeswararar Temple, Chennai and a court case is ongoing with regards to unauthorised and illegal demolition of a Siva temple in Thirukurungudi Temple.

Widely publicised complaints by Rangarajan Narasimhan, there are multiple FIRs and court cases against Venu Srinivasan:
 Damage of Sri Ranganatha Swamy moolavar during the 2015 Kumbabhishekam
 Stealing of Namperumal idol at the Srirangam temple in 2015
 Illegally being head of trustees, despite not being a hereditary trustee 
 Illegally conducting underground research and not involving the ASI 
 Illegal demolition of various statues inside the Srirangam Temple 
 Hurting religious sentiments by making pilgrims go counter clockwise to worship the deity
 Restricting devotees from undergoing 2nd prakara pradakshinam 
 Encouraging illegal VIP Darshana and not stopping this practice
 Temple revenue not being properly realised from nearly 2500 acres of land
 Venu Srinivasan was the head of the Thiruppani Committee for the Kabaleeswara Swamy temple, Chennai when the peacock Parvathi idol was stolen. He is on anticipatory bail in the ongoing court investigation
 Illegal demolition of Siva idol in the Thirukurungudi temple, for which a court case is ongoing

References

External links

Businesspeople from Tamil Nadu
Purdue University alumni
University of Madras alumni
Living people
Tamil businesspeople
Recipients of the Padma Shri in trade and industry
Year of birth missing (living people)
Tamil billionaires
Recipients of the Padma Bhushan in trade and industry
TVS Group